Ronald Francis Simson (6 September 1880 – 14 September 1914) was a Scottish rugby union player for . Simson was the first Scottish rugby international to die in the First World War.

Early life
Ronald Simson was born in Edinburgh on 6 September 1880.

Rugby Union career

Amateur career

He attended Edinburgh Academy and the Royal Military Academy, Woolwich, where he represented the Woolwich XV in a 49–9 victory over Royal Military College, Sandhurst. He also played for London Scottish, a team especially hard hit because many of them joined the London Scottish regiment.

Provincial career

He played for the Blues Trial side against the Whites Trial side on 21 January 1911, while still with London Scottish. He scored a try in the match but the Blues lost 19–26 to the Whites.

International career

Simson scored one try for Scotland in the game, which they lost 13–8.

Military service
Simson joined the Royal Field Artillery in July 1911. Having played for the Army & Navy team, he was selected to represent Scotland against England in 1911. He was promoted in July 1914 to Lieutenant in the 116th Battery, 26th Brigade. Simson was killed in the First Battle of the Aisne, which was the Allied follow-up offensive against the right wing of the German First Army (led by Alexander von Kluck) & Second Army (led by Karl von Bülow) as they retreated after the First Battle of the Marne earlier in September 1914. A shell exploded below the horse he was riding; both he and the horse were killed. He is buried at Moulins New Communal Cemetery in Aisne France.

See also
 List of international rugby union players killed in action during the First World War

References

 Bath, Richard (ed.) The Scotland Rugby Miscellany (Vision Sports Publishing Ltd, 2007 )

External links
 

Rugby union players from Edinburgh
1880 births
1914 deaths
People educated at Edinburgh Academy
Military personnel from Edinburgh
Graduates of the Royal Military Academy, Woolwich
Scotland international rugby union players
British military personnel killed in World War I
Royal Field Artillery officers
British Army personnel of World War I
Blues Trial players
Rugby union centres